Belkavak can refer to:

 Belkavak, Araç
 Belkavak, Çerkeş
 Belkavak, Osmancık